Vicksburg most commonly refers to:

 Vicksburg, Mississippi, a city in western Mississippi, United States
 The Vicksburg Campaign, an American Civil War campaign
 The Siege of Vicksburg, an American Civil War battle

Vicksburg is also the name of some places in the United States:
 Vicksburg, Arizona
 Vicksburg, Colorado, a ghost mining community listed on the National Register of Historic Places
 Vicksburg, Florida
 Vicksburg, Indiana
 Vicksburg, Kentucky
 Vicksburg, Michigan
 Vicksburg, Mississippi
 Vicksburg National Military Park
 Vicksburg, Missouri
 Vicksburg, Blair County, Pennsylvania
 Vicksburg, Union County, Pennsylvania

Vessels 
 USS Vicksburg, several warships

See also 
 Vicksberg, Minnesota